Sobradinho is an administrative region in the Federal District in Brazil.

History
Sobradinho began with a ranch of that name belonging to the municipality of Formosa, Goiás. According to popular history the name came from the existence of an old cross built long before 1850 along the banks of a stream near the ranch. On one of the arms of the cross were two little nests of a bird called joão de barro (Rufous hornero - Furnarius rufus), one on top of the other, forming a little two-story house—a sobradinho in Portuguese. This phenomenon attracted the attention of passersby who took it as a reference point with the name Cross of Sobradinho or Sobradinho of the Cross. As time went by the local stream was called Sobradinho Stream.

Because of the need to house the migrant families from the Northeast, Goiás, Bahia and other states, Sobradinho was created along the old highway that linked the city of Planaltina, Goiás and the Federal Capital being built (1959). Today that old highway is a four-lane motorway and residents of Sobradinho can be in Brasília in a few minutes time.

See also
List of administrative regions of the Federal District

References

External links

 Regional Administration of Sobradinho website
 Government of the Federal District website

1960 establishments in Brazil
Administrative regions of Federal District (Brazil)
Populated places established in 1960